Merlimont is a commune in the Pas-de-Calais department in the Hauts-de-France region of France.

Geography
Merlimont lies on the coast of France, facing northwards to the English Channel. Long, wide sandy beaches and huge sand-dunes are the most obvious features.

Population

Places of interest
Bagatelle, a theme park, was opened in 1955.

See also
Communes of the Pas-de-Calais department

References

External links

 Merlimont’s own website
 Bagatelle theme park in English

Communes of Pas-de-Calais
Populated coastal places in France